Ehsan Amini palangani, born 27 March 1986, Eslamabad-e Gharb, Iran) is an Iranian wrestler. He won gold at the 2011 Asian Wrestling Championships.

References

Sources
Profile

Living people
Iranian male sport wrestlers
1986 births
21st-century Iranian people